Shoshana Sharabi (1950 - 2018) was an Israeli Paralympic athlete, wheelchair fencer and wheelchair basketball player. She won two gold medals in foil, and wheelchair basketball.

Biography 
Shoshana Sharabi is left disabled by polio, which she contracted as a child. 

At the 1968 Summer Paralympics, she won a gold medal in Women's Novices Foil, and Women's Wheelchair Basketball . She won a bronze medal in Women's Club Throw D, and silver medal in Women's 4 x 40 meters Open. She competed in Women's Slalom C.

At the 1972 Summer Paralympics, she won a silver medal in Women's Foil Individual.

References 

1951 births
2018 deaths
Paralympic athletes of Israel
Paralympic wheelchair basketball players of Israel
Paralympic wheelchair fencers of Israel
Israeli female shot putters
Israeli women's wheelchair basketball players
Female wheelchair racers
Paralympic shot putters
Wheelchair shot putters
Athletes (track and field) at the 1968 Summer Paralympics
Athletes (track and field) at the 1972 Summer Paralympics
Wheelchair basketball players at the 1968 Summer Paralympics
Wheelchair fencers at the 1968 Summer Paralympics
Wheelchair fencers at the 1972 Summer Paralympics
Medalists at the 1968 Summer Paralympics
Medalists at the 1972 Summer Paralympics
Paralympic gold medalists for Israel
Paralympic silver medalists for Israel
Paralympic bronze medalists for Israel